Tom Baylis (born 3 January 1996 in Misterton) is an English former racing cyclist who competed for  from 2015 until 2018.

Major results

2015
 4th Time trial, National Under–23 Road Championships
2016
 1st Stage 1 (TTT) Ronde van Midden-Nederland
 5th Time trial, National Under–23 Road Championships
2017
 2nd Time trial, National Under–23 Road Championships
 3rd Overall Ronde van Midden-Nederland
1st Stage 1 (TTT)
2018
 2nd Trofej Umag

References

1996 births
Living people
English male cyclists